The Tuba Concerto is a composition for solo tuba and orchestra by the American composer Jennifer Higdon.  The work was commissioned by the Pittsburgh Symphony Orchestra for their principal tubist Craig Knox.  It was first performed by Knox and the Pittsburgh Symphony Orchestra under the conductor Robert Spano on March 16, 2018.

Composition

Structure
The concerto has a duration of approximately 19 minutes and is cast in three movements:
Dynamo
Crescent Line
Adamant Scherzo

Instrumentation
The work is scored for a solo tuba and an orchestra consisting of two flutes, oboe, English horn, two clarinets, bassoon, contrabassoon, four horns, three trumpets, three trombones, timpani, percussion, and strings.

Reception
Reviewing the world premiere, Jeremy Reynolds of the Pittsburgh Post-Gazette wrote, "Ms. Higdon's concerto was engaging throughout, with angular, dynamic melodies and short bursts of virtuosity in the tuba (really) throughout."  He continued:

References

Concertos by Jennifer Higdon
2017 compositions
Higdon, Jennifer
Music commissioned by the Pittsburgh Symphony Orchestra